The 2017–18 San Francisco Dons men's basketball team represented the University of San Francisco during the 2017–18 NCAA Division I men's basketball season. The Dons, led by second-year head coach Kyle Smith, played their home games at the War Memorial Gymnasium as members of the West Coast Conference. They finished the season 22–17, 9–9 in WCC play to finish in a three-way tie for fourth place. They defeated Pacific in the quarterfinals of the WCC tournament before losing in the semifinals to Gonzaga. They were invited to the College Basketball Invitational where they defeated Colgate, Utah Valley, and Campbell to advance to the best-of-three championship series against North Texas where they won game 1 before losing game 2 and 3.

Previous season
The Dons finished the 2016–17 season 20–13, 10–8 in WCC play to finish tied for fourth place in the conference. They lost in the quarterfinals of the WCC tournament to Santa Clara. They were invited to the College Basketball Invitational where they lost in the first round to Rice.

Offseason

Departures

Incoming transfers

2017 recruiting class

Roster

Schedule and results

|-
!colspan=12 style=| Non-conference regular season

|-
!colspan=12 style=| WCC regular season

|-
!colspan=9 style=| WCC tournament

|-
!colspan=9 style=| CBI

Source:

References

San Francisco Dons men's basketball seasons
San Francisco
San Francisco
San Francisco Dons
San Francisco Dons
San Francisco Dons
San Francisco Dons